Eshita Syed is a Pakistani model and TV actress.

Early life 
Eshita Syed was born on the 5th of August in 1988. She was raised in Karachi. Her parents were ethnically Bengali. She has acted in different serials on Geo TV, ARY Digital and Hum TV. Syed started her career as a model and later appeared in a music video 'Suno Ke Main Hun Jawan' by Noori, by which she started her career in the showbiz. She is best known for  doing supporting roles in Mannchalay, Aik Nayee Cinderella, Sanjha, Aseerzadi and Dayar-e-Dil. She will make her comeback with drama series Sila.

Filmography 
Eshita Syed joined the entertainment industry as a model at a very young age. She has done modeling for many trendy brands in Pakistan. Eshita Syed started her career with the music video for the song ‘Suno Ke Main Hun Jawan’ by Noori band which was released in 2003. Eshita came into the public eye through this video, after which resulted in many modeling offers. Eshita has done many photo shoots as a model and she often appears on the covers of famous fashion magazines such as Libaas. She has also worked in many TV commercials. After working as a model successfully for many years in the Pakistan fashion industry Eshita made her acting debut on the small screen in 2012 with the TV serial ‘Aik Nayee Cindrella’ on Geo TV. Eshita played a negative role in this serial and amazed audience with her skilled acting. She has numerous drama such as Aseerzadi as Yasmeen, Bharday Jholi, Dayar-e-Dil as Laila, Khatti Meethi Zindagi, Kis Din Mera Viyah Howay Ga season 3, Kissey Apna Kahein as Iqra, Kitni Girhain Baqi Hain, Kitni Girhain Baqi Hain (Khushi Kay Rang), Mannchalay, Mar Jaen Bhi To Kya, Mere Khuda as Nadia, Meri Jaan, Omer Dadi Aur Gharwale, Sanjha and Sharek-e-Hayat, Zindagi Tujh Ko Jiya as Samra.

Television 
 Aik Nayee Cinderella as Zainee
 Khatti Meethi Zindagi
 Kitni Girhain Baqi Hain
 Omar Dadi aur Gharwalay
 Kitni Girhain Baqi Hain (Khushi Kay Rang)
 Mannchalay
 Mar Jaen Bhi To Kya
 Sanjha
 Meri Jaan
 Aseerzadi as Yasmeen
 Kis Din Mera Viyah Howay Ga season 3
 Sharek-e-Hayat (Episode 4)
 Bharday Jholi
 Kissey Apna Kahein as Iqra
 Mere Khuda as Nadia
 Dayar-e-Dil as Laila
 Zindagi Tujh Ko Jiya as Samra
 dil dard Dhuan ARY Digital
 Morr Us Gali ka ARY Digital 
 Raastey Dil Ke TV One
 larkiyan Mohalley ki Hum TV
 Meri Jaan Hum TV 
 Najiah Hum TV
 Ek Mohabbat Kafi Hai Bol TV
 100 din ki Kahani
 Bhar de Jholi ARY digital

Films

References

External links 
 

Actresses from Karachi
Living people
Pakistani female models
Pakistani television actresses
21st-century Pakistani actresses
Year of birth missing (living people)